JH Engström (born 1969) is a Swedish photographer and artist based in Stockholm. He was shortlisted for the Deutsche Börse Photography Prize in 2005.

Biography
Engström was born 1969 in Karlstad, Sweden. He graduated in 1997 from the Photography and Film department at the University of Gothenburg.

Publications

Publications by Engström
Trying to Dance. Stockholm: Journal, 2003. .
Haunts. Göttingen: Steidl, 2006. .
CDG / JHE. Göttingen: Steidl, 2008. .
October 2016: Fear of Leaving. London: Morel, 2016.
Revoir. Stockholm: Journal; Tokyo: Akio Nagasawa, 2016. . With a text by :fr:Christian Caujolle. Edition of 600 copies.
Day by Day. Paris: Bessard 2020. Edition of 600 copies.

Publications paired with others
From Back Home. Stockholm: Bokförlaget Max Ström, 2009. With Anders Petersen. .
Karaoke Sunne. With Margot Wallard. Tokyo: Super Labo, 2014. Edition of 1000 copies.

Awards
Shortlisted for the Deutsche Börse Photography Prize, 2005, for Trying to Dance

Exhibitions
Je Suis Où, Contretype, Brussels, 2003
Deutsche Börse Photography Prize, The Photographers' Gallery, London, 2005. With Luc Delahaye, Jörg Sasse and Stephen Shore.
Haunts, Gallery Vu, Paris, 2006
Ca me touche, Les Rencontres d'Arles, Arles, France. Curated by Nan Goldin.
From Back Home, National Science and Media Museum, Bradford, UK, 2010. With Anders Petersen.

References

External links

20th-century Swedish photographers
21st-century Swedish photographers
Swedish artists
Living people
University of Gothenburg alumni
1969 births